The Lockheed Vega is an American five- to seven-seat high-wing monoplane airliner built by the Lockheed Corporation starting in 1927. It became famous for its use by a number of record-breaking pilots who were attracted to the rugged and very long-range design. Amelia Earhart became the first woman to fly solo across the Atlantic Ocean in one, and Wiley Post used his to prove the existence of the jet stream after having flown around the world twice.

Design and development
Designed by John Knudsen Northrop and Gerald Vultee, both of whom would later form their own companies, the aircraft was originally intended to serve with Lockheed's own airline routes. They set out to build a four-passenger (plus pilot) aircraft that was not only rugged but also one of the fastest aircraft of its era. Using a wooden monocoque fuselage, plywood-covered cantilever wings and the best engine available, the Vega delivered on the promise of speed.

The fuselage was built from sheets of plywood, skinned over wooden ribs. Using a large concrete mold, a single half of the fuselage shell was laminated in sections with glue between each layer and then a rubber bladder was lowered into the mold and inflated with air to compress the lamination into shape against the inside of the mold. The two fuselage halves were then nailed and glued over a separately constructed rib framework. With the fuselage constructed in this fashion, the wing spar couldn't cut through the fuselage, so the single spar cantilever wing was mounted atop the aircraft. Only the engine and landing gear remained essentially unstreamlined, and on the production versions the undercarriage had teardrop shaped fairings covering the wheels, while only the earliest versions lacked NACA cowlings and had the engine cylinders exposed to the airstream. It was powered by the Wright Whirlwind air-cooled radial engine, which delivered 225 horsepower (168 kW).

Operational history

The first Vega 1, named the Golden Eagle, flew from Lockheed's Los Angeles plant on July 4, 1927. It could cruise at a then-fast 120 mph (193 km/h), and had a top speed of 135 mph (217 km/h). The four-passenger (plus one pilot) load was considered too small for airline use. A number of private owners placed orders for the design, and by the end of 1928, 68 of this original design had been produced. In the 1929 National Air Races in Cleveland, Ohio, Vegas won every speed award.

In 1928, Vega Yankee Doodle (NX4769) was used to break transcontinental speed records. On August 19–20, Hollywood stunt flier Arthur C. Goebel broke the coast-to-coast record of Russell Maughan by flying from Los Angeles, California, to Garden City, New York, in 18 hours and 58 minutes, in what was also the first nonstop flight from west to east. On October 25, barnstormer and former mail pilot Charles B.D. Collyer broke the nonstop east to west record set in 1923 by the U.S. Army Air Service in 24 hours and 51 minutes. Trying to break the new West-to-East record on November 3, Collyer crashed near Prescott, Arizona, killing himself and the aircraft owner, Harry J. Tucker.

Looking to improve the design, Lockheed delivered the Vega 5 in 1929. Adding the Pratt & Whitney R-1340 Wasp engine of 450 hp (336 kW) and a new NACA cowling improved performance enough to allow the addition of two more seats, and increased cruising speed to 155 mph (249 km/h) and top speed to 165 mph (266 km/h). The new six-seat configuration proved to be too small, and the 5 was purchased primarily for private aviation and executive transport. A total of 64 Vega 5s were built. In 1931, the United States Army Air Corps bought two Vega 5s; one designated C-12 and one as the C-17. The C-17 had additional fuel tanks in the wings.

The Vega could be difficult to land. In her memoir, Elinor Smith wrote that it had "all the glide potential of a boulder falling off a mountain."  In addition, forward and side visibility from the cockpit was extremely limited; Lane Wallace, a columnist for Flying magazine, wrote that "Even [in level flight], the windscreen would offer a better view of the sky than anything else, which would make it more of a challenge to detect changes in attitude or bank angle.  On takeoff or landing, there'd be almost no forward visibility whatsoever."

Vega DL-1A: NC372E/G-ABFE/G-ABGK/VH-UVK/A42-1
A one-off special, based on the metal-fuselaged DL-1, was built by the Detroit Aircraft Corporation, and exported to the United Kingdom for Lt. Cmdr. Glen Kidston. It was initially registered in the UK as G-ABFE, then was re-registered as G-ABGK to incorporate Kidston's initials. He used this Vega to set a record-breaking time from the UK to South Africa in April 1931. Following Kidston's death the following month, the aircraft was eventually sold to Australian airline owner Horrie Miller, who entered it in the MacRobertson Air Race. Piloted in the race by Miller's Chief Pilot, Capt. Jimmy Woods, it overturned on landing at Aleppo en route, whereupon Woods withdrew from the race and the DL-1A was eventually shipped to Australia. Following repairs and re-registration as VH-UVK, Miller used the aircraft for charter and leisure flying, after which it was impressed by the Royal Australian Air Force in 1941. In 1944 the aircraft was transferred to the Australian Department of Civil Aviation (DCA). Via information from RAAF pilots, DCA declared the Vega to have serious pitch control problems and it would be scrapped. Attempts by James Woods to reclaim the aircraft were ignored, and it was destroyed in October 1945. It was the only Vega to operate in Australia.

Variants

Vega 1 Five-seat cabin monoplane, accommodation for one pilot and four passengers, powered by a 225 hp (168 kW) Wright J-5, J-5A, J-5AB or J-5C Whirlwind radial piston engine. 
Vega 2 Five-seat cabin monoplane, powered by a 300 hp (224 kW) Wright J-6 Whirlwind radial piston engine.
Vega 2A Redesignation of one Vega 2 aircraft, modified for higher gross weight operation.
Vega 2D Redesignation of two Vega 1s and one Vega 2, each fitted with a 300 hp (224 kW) Pratt & Whitney Wasp radial piston engine.
Vega 5 Improved version, powered by a 410 hp (306 kW) Wasp A, 450 hp (336 kW) Wasp B or 420 hp (313 kW) Wasp C1 radial piston engine.
Vega 5A Executive Executive transport version, with a plush interior.
Vega 5B Seven-seat passenger transport version, built for higher gross weight operations with commercial operators.
Vega 5C Seven-seat cabin monoplane, with revised tail surfaces, built for higher gross weight operations.
DL-1 Vega 5C with an aluminum fuselage. Built by the Detroit Aircraft Corporation.
DL-1A/DL-1 Special One-off air racing and record breaking version, c/n 155.
DL-1B Seven-seat cabin monoplane, similar to the DL-1. Built by the Detroit Aircraft Corporation.
Y1C-12 One DL-1 acquired by the U.S. Army Air Corps for service tests and evaluation.
Y1C-17 One DL-1B acquired by the U.S. Army Air Corps for service tests and evaluation.
UC-101 One Vega 5C impressed into service with the U.S. Army Air Force in 1942.

Operators

Royal Australian Air Force – one aircraft

 Lithuanian Air Force - one aircraft (s/n. 134, former registration NC926Y), 1935-1940, purchased after the trans-Atlantic flight (Lituanica II)
 Spain
Spanish Republican Air Force – one aircraft

United States Army Air Corps
United States Army Air Forces

Aircraft on display

 22 – Vega 5B on static display at the National Air and Space Museum in Washington, D.C. This was Amelia Earhart's aircraft.
 40 – Vega 2D on static display at The Henry Ford Museum in Dearborn, Michigan. It was used by Donald Baxter MacMillan for exploration and mapping.
 72 – Vega 5C under restoration to airworthy status by Kevin Kimball in Mt. Dora, Florida for Fantasy of Flight in Polk City, Florida. First owned by the Independent Oil and Gas Company of Tulsa, Oklahoma; it was restored by Dave Jameson in 1969 in the paint scheme of the Winnie Mae. The aircraft was also an airborne electronics laboratory for the General Electric company. It differs from the original with a larger R-1340 engine installation.
 122 Winnie Mae – Vega 5C on static display at the National Air and Space Museum in Washington, D.C. It was flown around the world twice and for high altitude testing by Wiley Post.
 161 – DL-1B on display with Mid America Flight Museum of Mount Pleasant, TX. It was originally registered as NC12288. Its first post-restoration flight, by John O. Magoffin Jr and Rick Barter, was on the centenary of powered flight, 17 December 2013.
 203 Shell Oil Number 7 – Vega 5C owned and operated by Walter Bowe. It was flown by Jimmy Doolittle.

Specifications (Vega 5C)

See also

References

Notes

Citations

Bibliography
 Allen, Richard Sanders. Revolution in the Sky: Those Fabulous Lockheeds, The Pilots Who Flew Them. Brattleboro, Vermont: The Stephen Greene Press, 1964.
 Boyne, Walter J. Beyond the Horizons: The Lockheed Story. New York: St. Martin's Press, 1998. .
 Francillon, René J. Lockheed Aircraft since 1913. Annapolis, Maryland: Naval Institute Press, 1987. .

 Smith, Elinor. Aviatrix. New York: Harcourt Brace Jovanovich, 1981. .

External links

 Lockheed Vega 5B 
 The Lockheed Vega in the film Flying Down to Rio
 "Wiley Post seeks New Record" Popular Mechanics, October 1934 pp. 492–494. Drawing of Winnie Mae modified for high altitude record attempt

Vega
1920s United States civil utility aircraft
Single-engined tractor aircraft
High-wing aircraft
Aircraft first flown in 1927